Nicholls-Crook House is a historic home located near Spartanburg, Spartanburg County, South Carolina.  It was built about 1800, and is a -story, three bay, brick Georgian style dwelling. The interior features large fireplaces, an original hand-carved mantel, and a full basement, that was used as domestic slave quarters.

It was listed on the National Register of Historic Places in 1973.

References

Houses on the National Register of Historic Places in South Carolina
Georgian architecture in South Carolina
Houses completed in 1800
Houses in Spartanburg County, South Carolina
National Register of Historic Places in Spartanburg County, South Carolina
Slave cabins and quarters in the United States